Taft Correctional Institution was a low-security federal prison for male inmates located in Taft, Kern County, California, owned by the Federal Bureau of Prisons (BOP) and operated by Management and Training Corporation under contract with the BOP. It also included a satellite prison camp for minimum-security male inmates. 

The facility opened in 1997 as the first private prison contract of the BOP; the contract was awarded to Wackenhut Corrections Corporation, and then operated the facility under the name of The GEO Group. In August 2016, Justice Department officials announced that the BOP would be phasing out its use of contracted facilities, on the grounds that private prisons provided less safe and less effective services with no substantial cost savings. The agency expects to allow current contracts on its thirteen remaining private facilities to expire. 

The facility was slated to close in 2019, but was extended several times into 2020. The congressman for the area, Kevin McCarthy, opposed the closure. The correctional institute closed on April 30, 2020.

Notable inmates 
 Jordan Belfort
 Don Blankenship
 Tommy Chong
 Sunny Garcia
 Vic Kohring
 Rudy Kurniawan
 Richard Pinedo

References

Defunct prisons in California
Buildings and structures in Kern County, California
Management and Training Corporation
1997 establishments in California